Little Heroes is a 1999 American family comedy television film directed by Henri Charr and starring Brad Sergi and Thomas Garner as two bumbling kidnappers tasked with abducting the 8-year-old son (Camryn Walling) of a tobacco company employee who is about to testify against his employers in court. The film's plot revolves around the two family dogs constantly thwarting the two kidnappers.

Cast
Thomas Garner as Carny
Brad Sergi as Slick
Camryn Walling as Charlie Burton
Dean Howell as Harry Burton
Kristine Mejia as Shelly Burton
Erica Shaffer as Ms Bakman
Mimi Planas as Maria
Jeffrey Asch as Pizza delivery man
John Colton as Tobacco company CEO

Other actors with minor roles in the film include Tirion Mortrell, Scott St. James, Heinrich James, Benoit Badot, Amber J. Lawson, Tony Lipari and Kevin Weiler

Sequels
The film has two follow ups, Little Heroes 2 (2000) and Little Heroes 3 (2002). Both sequels were also television films.

Home video release
Little Heroes was released on VHS and DVD. It was also released in the UK on a double feature VHS, the VHS including Little Heroes and A Kid Called Danger (1999). The two sequels Little Heroes 2 (2000) and Little Heroes 3 (2002) were also released on DVD. In the UK they were distributed on DVD under the titles Dog Story: Little Heroes 2 and Top Dogs: Little Heroes 3.

In 2019, Little Heroes and Little Heroes 2 were re-cut into Paws to the Rescue.

External links

References

1999 films
1999 comedy films
Films about dogs
1990s English-language films
American comedy television films
1990s American films